Poitiers–Biard Airport is an airport located at Biard,  west of Poitiers, in the Vienne department of the Nouvelle-Aquitaine region in France.

Facilities 
It has one paved runway designated 03/21 which measures . The longer grass runway is for use by glider aircraft.

Airlines and destinations 
The following airlines operate regular scheduled and charter flights at Poitiers–Biard Airport:

Statistics

References

External links 
 Aéroport de Poitiers-Biard (official site) 
 Aéroport de Poitiers-Biard (Union des Aéroports Français) 
 
 
 

Airports in Nouvelle-Aquitaine
Buildings and structures in Vienne
Airports established in 1924
1924 establishments in France